The red-thighed sparrowhawk (Accipiter erythropus), alternatively known as the red-legged sparrowhawk or western little sparrowhawk, is a species of sparrowhawk in the family Accipitridae from western and northern central Africa.

Description
A very small, dove-sized sparrowhawk with a distinctive tail pattern. The red-thighed sparrowhawk is sexually dimorphic, the males of the nominate subspecies having very dark grey upperparts with a white crescent on the lower rump which is conspicuous in flight, as are three white broken tail bars on the dark grey tail. In contrast to the blackish cheeks the throat is white with the rest of the underparts pinkish white. The vermilion eye is surrounded by a red eye ring, the cere is orange red and the legs are bright orange yellow. Males of the subspecies A.e. zenkeri have deep rufous underparts and more obvious white spots on the tail. Females are much bigger than the males, with browner upperparts and a more brownish orange eye. Juveniles normally have the underparts barred with brown, sometimes up to the breast.

Distribution and subspecies
There are currently two recognised subspecies of red-thighed sparrowhawk.

Accipiter erythropus erythropus: Senegal and Gambia west to Nigeria.
Accipiter erythropus zenkeri: Cameroon west to western Uganda, central Democratic Republic of the Congo and Gabon south to northern Angola.

Habitat
The red-thighed sparrowhawk is found in lowland primary rainforest, along the forest edges and in clearings, as well as in older secondary forest.

Habits
The red-thighed sparrowhawk is a secretive and crepuscular species that spends most of the day perched in the interior of the forest. Its main prey is small birds up to the size of pigeons as well as lizards, amphibians, and insects. Prey is captured in quick dashes from a perch in the forest understory. This species often hunts co-operatively in pairs to harass mixed-species bird flocks.

The breeding behaviour is little known but it does build a small stick nest in the fork of a tree, the only record being a family of five recorded in Liberia in December 1996.

References

red-thighed sparrowhawk
Birds of Sub-Saharan Africa
red-thighed sparrowhawk
Taxonomy articles created by Polbot